Wide Mouth Mason is the eponymous second studio album by the Canadian blues-rock band Wide Mouth Mason and the first to be released on a major label. The band re-recorded most of their independent first album, The Nazarene, for inclusion on the album as well as the new song "This Mourning".

Track listing
All songs were written by Wide Mouth Mason.
 "My Old Self" - 3:48
 "Midnight Rain" - 3:47
 "Tom Robinson" - 2:59
 "The River Song" - 3:23
 "This Mourning" - 4:55
 "The Preacherman's Song" - 3:04
 "The Game" - 3:57
 "All It Amounts To" - 4:29
 "Corn Rows" - 4:17
 "Sister Sally" - 5:25
 "Tell Me" - 3:34
 "Mary Mary" - 4:15

Personnel
 Shaun Verreault - guitars, vocals
 Earl Pereira - bass guitar, backing vocals
 Safwan Javed - drums, backing vocals
Additional musicians:
 Tanya Hancheroff - backing vocals on tracks 5, 8 and 9
 Mike Kalanj - hammond organ on tracks 10 and 12
 Mike Weaver - rhodes on track 9
 Natasha Boyko - cello on track 4
 Kilarney Secondary High School Choir - backing vocals on track 8
 Colin James - dobro on track 6

References

1997 albums
Wide Mouth Mason albums
Albums recorded at Greenhouse Studios